George Forrest (26 October 1921 – 10 December 1968) was a unionist politician in Northern Ireland who served as MP for Mid Ulster from 1956 until his death. George Forrest was the son of Joseph Forrest (died 22 February 1968, aged 81) of Gortagammon, Tullyhogue, Cookstown, County Tyrone.

Forrest was first elected in the 1956 Mid Ulster by-election which was called after two previous MPs had been declared ineligible to sit. Initially elected as an independent, Forrest soon joined the Ulster Unionist Party and successfully contested the seat in three general elections. He became a prominent supporter of Prime Minister of Northern Ireland Terence O'Neill's liberal policies and became reviled by many of O'Neill's opponents. In 1967 he was pulled off a Twelfth of July platform in Coagh and kicked unconscious by fellow members of the Orange Order. Following his death in 1968 aged 47, his wife Anna was chosen to take over his candidacy, but the by-election was won by Bernadette Devlin.

References

External links 
 

1921 births
1968 deaths
Independent members of the House of Commons of the United Kingdom
Independent politicians in Northern Ireland
Members of the Parliament of the United Kingdom for Mid Ulster
Ulster Unionist Party members of the House of Commons of the United Kingdom
UK MPs 1955–1959
UK MPs 1959–1964
UK MPs 1964–1966
UK MPs 1966–1970